Meredith is an unincorporated community and a U.S. Post Office in Pitkin County, Colorado, United States.  The Meredith Post Office has the ZIP Code 81642.

Meredith was a limestone quarry town as well as a lumber camp in the 1890s. It is now mainly a "resort area". There are many original occupied buildings.

Geography
Meredith is located at  (39.362174,-106.730633).

See also

Colorado
Outline of Colorado
Index of Colorado-related articles
Bibliography of Colorado
Geography of Colorado
History of Colorado
Colorado statistical areas
Glenwood Springs, CO Micropolitan Statistical Area
List of counties in Colorado
Pitkin County, Colorado
List of places in Colorado
List of census-designated places in Colorado
List of forts in Colorado
List of ghost towns in Colorado
List of mountain passes in Colorado
List of mountain peaks of Colorado
List of municipalities in Colorado
List of post offices in Colorado
Protected areas of Colorado

References

External links

Unincorporated communities in Pitkin County, Colorado
Unincorporated communities in Colorado